Mathara may refer to :

 Mathara in Numidia, an ancient city and present titular see in North Africa
 Matara, Sri Lanka
 Mathara dynasty, a 4th-5th century dynasty of India